Yuriy Naydovskiy  (born 10 April 1963) is a former Kazakhstani professional football player. He played for Kairat Almaty in the Soviet Top League and Kazakhstan Premier League.

Naydovskiy made three appearances for the Kazakhstan national football team, all at the 1992 Central Asian Cup.

References

External links
 

1963 births
Living people
Kazakhstani footballers
Kazakhstan international footballers
FC Kairat players
FC Metalurh Zaporizhzhia players
FC Energiya Volzhsky players
Association football forwards